Machaeraptenus ventralis is a moth of the family Erebidae first described by William Schaus in 1894. It is found in Venezuela, French Guiana and Bolivia.

References

Phaegopterina
Moths described in 1894